The 1922 Pontypridd by-election was held on 25 July 1922. The by-election was held due to the appointment of the incumbent Coalition Liberal MP, Thomas Arthur Lewis, as a Junior Lord of the Treasury. It was won by the Labour candidate Thomas Isaac Mardy Jones.  It was the last of only eight ministerial by-elections in the UK not to be retained by the incumbent. The requirement for MPs who were appointed as ministers to seek re-election was entirely abolished by the Re-Election of Ministers Act (1919) Amendment Act 1926.

References

1922 elections in the United Kingdom
1922 in Wales
1920s elections in Wales
July 1922 events
Politics of Glamorgan
By-elections to the Parliament of the United Kingdom in Welsh constituencies
Ministerial by-elections to the Parliament of the United Kingdom